Eudulini is a tribe of geometer moths under the subfamily Larentiinae.

Genera
 Eubaphe Hübner, 1823
 Eudule Hübner, 1823
 Eudulophasia Warren, 1897

References

 
Larentiinae